Heritage Tower may refer to:

 Tower Hotel (Niagara Falls)
 Heritage Tower (Battle Creek, Michigan)